Gaulke is a surname. Notable people with the surname include:

Cheri Gaulke (born 1954), American artist
Ellsworth K. Gaulke (1925–1993), American businessman, educator, and politician
Hal Gaulke (1894–1971), American football player